The Bhagalpur – Anand Vihar Terminal Garib Rath Express is a superfast train of Indian Railways which connects Bhagalpur, an important town of Bihar and Delhi, the capital of India. Before inauguration, this train ran between Rajendra Nagar Terminal and New Delhi. The train is hauled from Bhagalpur Junction to Anand Vihar Terminal by a WAP 5 locomotive of Electric Loco Shed, Ghaziabad.

Traction 

As the route is fully electrified since June 2019 train is hauled by an Electric Loco Shed, Ghaziabad based WAP-4/WAP-5 electric locomotive throughout the journey, and vice versa.

Route & Halts

It commences its journey from the Bhagalpur Junction railway station  and travels through the Indian states of Bihar and Uttar Pradesh to reach Anand Vihar Terminal near Delhi.

Coach composition

The train has standard ICF rakes with max speed of 110 km/h. The train consists of 20 coaches:

 18 AC III Tier
 2 Sleeper cum EOG

See also
 Bhagalpur - Lokmanya Tilak Terminus Superfast Express
 Surat–Bhagalpur Express
 Vikramshila Express
 Anga Express

Transport in Bhagalpur
Transport in Delhi
Rail transport in Bihar
Rail transport in Uttar Pradesh
Rail transport in Delhi
Garib Rath Express trains